The Kinetic Simulation Algorithm Ontology (KiSAO) supplies information about existing algorithms available for the simulation of systems biology models, their characterization and interrelationships. KiSAO is part of the BioModels.net project and of the COMBINE initiative.

Structure
KiSAO consists of three main branches:
 simulation algorithm
 simulation algorithm characteristic
 simulation algorithm parameter
The elements of each algorithm branch are linked to characteristic and parameter branches using has characteristic and has parameter relationships accordingly. The algorithm branch itself is hierarchically structured using relationships which denote that the descendant algorithms were derived from, or specify, more general ancestors.

See also

 COMBINE
 SED-ML
 MIRIAM
 SBO
 TEDDY

References

Systems biology
Bioinformatics software
Free science software
Algorithms
Biological databases